Polizzi may refer to :
 Polizzi (surname)
 Polizzi Generosa, a town in the Province of Palermo on the island of Sicily, Italy